Fabrice Mercury (born 6 August 1981) is a football goalkeeper from Guadeloupe.

Mercury played club football for CS Moulien from 2005 to 2014, captaining his side to four local championships.

Mercury was the reserve goalkeeper for the Guadeloupe national football team for the 2007 Caribbean Cup, 2007 and 2011 CONCACAF Gold Cup. He made an appearance in the 2007 Caribbean Cup semi-finals, as Guadeloupe lost 3–1 to Haiti.

References

External links
Goal.com

1981 births
Living people
Association football goalkeepers
Guadeloupean footballers
2007 CONCACAF Gold Cup players
2011 CONCACAF Gold Cup players
Guadeloupe international footballers